The 1985 Coca-Cola World 600, the 26th running of the event, was a NASCAR Winston Cup Series race held on May 26, 1985 at Charlotte Motor Speedway in Charlotte, North Carolina. Contested over 400 laps on the 1.5 mile (2.4 km) speedway, it was the 11th race of the 1985 NASCAR Winston Cup Series season. Darrell Waltrip of Junior Johnson & Associates won the race.

This race was Michael Waltrip's Winston Cup debut. Dick Brooks would retire from NASCAR after the conclusion of this event. Terry Labonte's fifth-place finish would be sufficient for him to take away the championship points lead from Bill Elliott.

This was the third of four designated races that made up the first Winston Million promotion. Bill Elliott, winner of the first two Winston Million races at Daytona and Talladega and the sensation of the 1985 NASCAR Winston Cup season, brought much media attention to the race in his bid to win the $1,000,000 bonus. Instead, Darrell Waltrip drove to a dominating win. Elliott would win the bonus at race 4, the 1985 Southern 500.

Background
Charlotte Motor Speedway is a motorsports complex located in Concord, North Carolina, United States 13 miles from Charlotte, North Carolina. The complex features a 1.5 miles (2.4 km) quad oval track that hosts NASCAR racing including the prestigious Coca-Cola World 600 on Memorial Day weekend and The Winston, as well as the Miller High Life 500. The speedway was built in 1959 by Bruton Smith and is considered the home track for NASCAR with many race teams located in the Charlotte area. The track is owned and operated by Speedway Motorsports Inc. (SMI).

Top ten results

Race statistics
 Time of race: 4:13:52
 Average Speed: 
 Pole Speed: 
 Cautions: 7 for 34 laps
 Margin of Victory: 14.64 seconds
 Lead changes: 29

References

Coca-Cola World 600
Coca-Cola World 600
NASCAR races at Charlotte Motor Speedway